The Fortune 30 is a Canadian sailboat that was conceived by Canadian TV weather presenter, Bob Fortune and designed by Stan Huntingford as a cruiser, first built in 1974.

Production
The design's hull was built by Cooper Enterprises in Port Coquitlam, British Columbia and then finished by a number of local boatyards, including Philbrook's Boatyard in Sidney, British Columbia.

Design
The Fortune 30 is a recreational keelboat, built predominantly of fibreglass, with wood trim. It has a cutter rig, a clipper bow, an angled transom, a skeg-mounted rudder controlled by a wheel and a fixed fin keel. It displaces  and carries  of ballast.

The boat is fitted with a Swedish Volvo diesel engine for docking and manoeuvring.

See also
List of sailing boat types

References

External links
Photo of a Fortune 30

Keelboats
1970s sailboat type designs
Sailing yachts
Sailboat type designs by Stan Huntingford
Sailboat types built by Cooper Enterprises